Hollywood is a Brazilian brand of cigarette, currently owned and manufactured by Souza Cruz, a subsidiary of British American Tobacco. It is one of Brazil's best-known and sold cigarette brands, second to Derby brand.

History
In 1903, Albino Souza Cruz, a manufacturer of cigarettes, settled in Rio de Janeiro and created a company to sell different brands of cigarettes. In 1931, he announced the launch of the Hollywood cigarettes, which gradually became famous for using a slogan, namely, "success".

In the early 1970s, Souza Cruz invented the slogan "Isto é Hollywood" ("This is Hollywood"), popularizing the image through rustic and well related young practicing extreme sports. The motto remains alive to this day: ""Isto é Hollywood O Sucesso" ("This is Hollywood success").

The "young" practicing various kinds of sports, who were the characters in the TV advertisements, were responsible for the brand's success by associating it with the idea of adventure. The appeal took, too, to the patronage of a pioneer rock festival organized in Brazil, Hollywood Rock, in the summer of 1975 in Rio de Janeiro. The event was recorded in the breakneck pace of the same year.

In the 1990s, more ads were displayed, of which the "Flying Lap" commercial was one of them. TV sponsorship for Hollywood, as well as various other brands, ended once the Brazilian parliament voted to repeal cigarette advertisements on public television.

As of 2016, the brand Marlboro has surpassed Hollywood as the most popular brand, making it the second most popular brand in Brazil.

Sponsorships

Formula 1
During the 1977 Formula One season, the March F1 Team was sponsored by Hollywood cigarettes. Alex Ribeiro drove the car during all races.

CART 
During 1993 until 1999 the Dick Simon Racing, Chip Ganassi Racing and PacWest Racing was sponsored by Hollywood cigarettes. Maurício Gugelmin drove the car. And was the main sponsor of Mo Nunn Racing during the 2000 and 2001 season.

Markets
Hollywood cigarettes are mainly sold in Brazil, but also are or were sold in Cuba, Paraguay, Germany, Czech Republic, Latvia, Slovakia, Belarus, Georgia and Bangladesh.

See also

 Tobacco smoking

References

1931 establishments in Brazil
British American Tobacco brands